Audrey Parker may refer to:

Audrey Parker (Haven), fictional character in Haven
Audrey Parker-Nichols, fictional character in Drake & Josh
Audrey Parker (The 4400), fictional character in The 4400